The Arena (Italian: La rivolta delle gladiatrici, lit. "The revolt of the gladiatrices"), also known as Naked Warriors, is a 1974 gladiator exploitation film directed by Steve Carver and starring Margaret Markov and Pam Grier. Joe D'Amato, the film's cinematographer, has stated that he took over direction of the fight scenes in the film.

Pam Grier and Margaret Markov portray female gladiators in ancient Rome, who have been enslaved and must fight for their freedom. This marks the second teaming of Grier and Markov; in 1972 they had starred together in the women in prison film Black Mama, White Mama.

Plot

In the ancient Roman town of Brundisium, a group of slave girls are sold to a man named Timarchus, the organizer of the events that take place in the town’s colosseum. After a fight breaks out amongst the girls, Timarchus gets the idea of putting the women in the ring to fight to the death. The recently captured Mamawi and Bodicia realize they must stick together if they are to survive.

Cast
Margaret Markov — Bodicia
Pam Grier — Mamawi
Lucretia Love — Deirdre
Paul Muller — Lucilius
Daniele Vargas — Timarchus
Marie Louise — Livia
Mary Count — Lucinia
Rosalba Neri — Cornelia
Vassili Karis — Marcus
Sid Lawrence — Priscium
Mimmo Palmara — Rufinius
Antonio Casale — Lucan
Franco Garofalo — Aemilius
Pietro Ceccarelli — Septimus
Jho Jhenkins — Quintus

Production

Martin Scorsese said that Roger Corman offered him the film to direct following Boxcar Bertha. However he elected to make Mean Streets instead.

Whereas Steve Carver is credited as the director in the American version of the film, the Italian version omits Carver and names "Michael Wotruba" as director instead. Michael Wotruba was a pseudonym then used by Joe D'Amato. D'Amato is credited in both versions as cinematographer under his birth name Aristide Massaccesi. In an interview, D'Amato said the Italian producer Franco Gaudenzi did not trust Carver, who was sent by Roger Corman, and sent D'Amato to take care of the cinematography and help Carver if needed. According to D'Amato, Carver ended up directing the scenes with dialogues whereas he himself took care of the fight sequences in the arena.

Remakes

A remake of this film was released directly to video in 2001. It was filmed in Russia by Russian director Timur Bekmambetov with a Russian crew, and it featured Playboy Playmates Karen McDougal and Lisa Dergan in their feature film debut.

See also
 List of American films of 1974

References

External links

 

The Arena at Variety Distribution

1974 films
1970s adventure films
Blaxploitation films
American exploitation films
Italian exploitation films
English-language Italian films
1970s English-language films
Films directed by Joe D'Amato
New World Pictures films
Films about gladiatorial combat
Films directed by Steve Carver
Films scored by Francesco De Masi
Films set in ancient Rome
Films set in the Roman Empire
Films produced by Roger Corman
1970s American films
1970s Italian films